Rakesh Asthana (born 9 July 1961) is a retired Indian Police Service (IPS). He is of the 1984 batch of Gujarat cadre who served as the Special Director at the Central Bureau of Investigation(CBI). In July 2021, he was appointed as Police Commissioner of Delhi. He retired on 31 July 2022 after an extension of 1 year.

Early life and education
Rakesh Asthana was educated at Netarhat Residential School, Netarhat and at the St. John's College, Agra.

Career
Rakesh Asthana investigated the Fodder Scam, a corruption scandal that involved the embezzlement of about ₹9.4 billion in Bihar. He filed a charge sheet against Lalu Prasad Yadav in 1996. Lalu was arrested for the first time in 1997.

Asthana caught DGMS Director General taking bribes in Dhanbad. By that time, this was the first case of its kind in the whole country, when the officers of the Director-General had come under arrest.

Rakesh also investigated the 2008 Ahmedabad bombings. 

Asthana had also examined the case of Asaram Bapu and his son Narayan Sai. The absconding Narayan Sai was caught on the Haryana-Delhi border.

As Police Commissioner of Delhi
On 27 July, 2021, just four days before his superannuation, he was appointed as the Commissioner of Police, Delhi, succeeding Balaji Shrivastava who was acting as the Commissioner since the retirement of S.N. Shrivastava.

Controversy 
The NGO, Common Cause, had approached Court challenging Asthana’s appointment as Special Director on the grounds that his name had figured in a 2011 diary seized from Sterling Biotech – a company being probed by the CBI for money laundering. Asthana was not named in the FIR but was presumably the subject of an ongoing investigation by his own agency.

Asthana was entangled in a bribery controversy along with Alok Verma, Special Director CBI in a corruption scandal; both accused each other of bribery and subsequently asked to go on leave by the Government, on the recommendation of the Central Vigilance Commission.

Verma and Asthana were sent on leave on the recommendation of the CVC by the Government of India. Verma went to the Supreme Court of India to appeal and Asthana to Delhi High Court. Supreme Court cancelled the decision to send Verma on leave and Verma was reinstated as CBI director two months later with the instruction that he not take any major decisions till the Selection Committee decides his fate over the corruption charges.

The investigation by the CBI has been completed, giving Rakesh Asthana a clean chit, which was accepted by the Special CBI Court.

References

1961 births
Living people
Indian Police Service officers
Central Bureau of Investigation
Alumni of the Netarhat Residential School
People from Bihar
Directors of the Central Bureau of Investigation